Mike or Michael McConnell is the name of:

Michael W. McConnell (born 1955), American constitutional law scholar and former appellate judge
Mike McConnell (U.S. Naval officer) (born 1943), American naval officer and Director of National Intelligence of the United States
Mike McConnell (radio personality), Cincinnati, Ohio-based radio talk show host